De N239 is a regional road in Belgium between Ottignies (N237) and Wavre (N4/N243). The road has a length of about 7 kilometers.

References 

239